Archibald Richard Burdon Haldane CBE (18 November 1900 – 18 October 1982) was a Scottish social historian and writer.

He was the son of Edith (née Nelson) and Sir William Haldane, grandson of James Alexander Haldane, and nephew of Richard Burdon Haldane, 1st Viscount Haldane.  His brother was Graeme Haldane and he married Janet Macrae Simpson-Smith.

Like his father and uncles, he attended the Edinburgh Academy, after which he went up to Balliol College, Oxford to read history. He returned to Scotland to enter his father's legal firm and acted for a time as Fiscal to the Society of Writers to the Signet. He then became involved in the Savings Bank movement and was at one stage vice-chairman of the Savings Bank Association. In 1982, he was appointed a CBE in recognition of his work for the bank.

He was principally known, however, as a social historian and author, and for his seminal work on the drovers' roads of Scotland. In recognition for his work in this field, he was awarded the honorary degree of D Litt from the University of Edinburgh in 1952. He published two further books in this field, New Ways through the Glens and Three centuries of Scottish posts, as well as several on his favourite pastime of trout fishing, of which he was passionately fond.

Selected bibliography
 By Many Waters - 1940
 The Path by the Water - 1944
 The Drove Roads of Scotland - 1952
 New Ways Through the Glens: Highland Road, Bridge and Canal Makers of the Early 19th Century - 1962
 Three Centuries of Scottish Posts: an Historical Survey to 1836 - 1971
 By River, Stream and Loch: Thirty Years with a Trout Rod - 1973
 Great Fishmonger of the Tay: John Richardson of Perth and Pitfour, 1760-1821 - 1981

References

Sources
 175 Accies by Bill Stirling, 1999

1900 births
1982 deaths
Scottish scholars and academics
People educated at Edinburgh Academy
A. R.B.